Thaduka is a genus of butterflies in the family Lycaenidae, the blues. It is monotypic, containing only the species Thaduka multicaudata, the many-tailed oak-blue, which is found in India, Burma and Indochina.

Description

References

Arhopalini
Monotypic butterfly genera
Taxa named by Frederic Moore
Lycaenidae genera